Dr. Loren E. Babcock (born May 26, 1961) is an American geologist. He is professor of Earth Science at Ohio State University. Babcock has written over 125 scientific articles and the textbook, Visualizing Earth History. He researches topics in processes of fossilization and the evolutionary history of trilobites and other Cambrian fossils. A fellow from the Geological Society of America, Babcock was the recipient of the Charles Schuchert Award for Excellence and Promise in Paleontology and the Erasmus Haworth Award for Distinguished Alumni Honors in Geology. He received a Ph.D. from the University of Kansas in 1990.

In 2008, he was one of a team of researchers who discovered the oldest footprints ever found, over 570 million years old, in Nevada. Although he was uncertain, Babcock believed that they came from an arthropod species.

References

American geologists
1961 births
People from Buffalo, New York
Ohio State University faculty
Living people
University of Kansas alumni